Frances Howard may refer to:
Frances Howard, Countess of Surrey née de Vere (1516–1577), daughter of the Earl of Oxford and wife of the executed Henry Howard, Earl of Surrey
Frances Howard, Countess of Kildare (d. 1628), courtier
Frances Stewart, Duchess of Lennox née Frances Howard (1578–1639), daughter of Thomas Howard, Viscount Bindon
Frances Carr, Countess of Somerset née Frances Howard (1591–1632), countess of Somerset and dau. of Lord Thomas Howard

Frances Howard (actress) (1903–1976), American actress and wife of film producer Samuel Goldwyn
Frances Minturn Howard (1905–1995), American poet
Frances Drake or Frances Howard (1912–2000), American actress

See also
Francis Howard (disambiguation)